Tepeköy (literally "hill village") is a popular Turkish place name and may refer to:

Tepeköy, Akçakoca
Tepeköy, Aydın, a village in Aydın district of Aydın Province, Turkey
Tepeköy, Bala, a village in Bala district of Ankara Province, Turkey
Tepeköy, Bergama, a village in Bergama district of İzmir Province, Turkey
Tepeköy, Bor, a village in Bor district of Niğde Province, Turkey
Tepeköy, Çan
Tepeköy, Çine, a village in Çine district of Aydın Province, Turkey
Tepeköy, Çilimli
Tepeköy, Damal, a village in Damal district of Ardahan Province, Turkey
Tepeköy, Dursunbey, a village
Tepeköy, Elâzığ
Tepeköy, Emirdağ, a village in Emirdağ district of Afyon Province, Turkey
Tepeköy, Hamamözü, a village in Hamamözü district of Amasya Province, Turkey
Tepeköy, Haymana, a village in Haymana district of Ankara Province, Turkey
Tepeköy, Manavgat, a village in Manavgat district of Antalya Province, Turkey
Tepeköy, Mersin, a town in Mersin Province, Turkey
Tepeköy, Nallıhan, a village in Nallıhan district of Ankara Province, Turkey
Tepeköy, Tarsus, a village in Tarsus district of Mersin Province, Turkey
Tepeköy, Sarayköy
Tepeköy, Refahiye
Tepeköy, Şavşat, a village in Şavşat district of Artvin Province, Turkey
Tepeköy, Seben
Tepeköy railway station, Torbalı, the southern terminus of the IZBAN's Southern Line